Köln-Weiden West is a railway station situated at Weiden, Cologne in the German state of North Rhine-Westphalia on the Cologne–Aachen railway. It is classified by Deutsche Bahn as a category 5 station.

Station
The Stadtbahn station is on ground level just south of the line, enabling direct interchange. A light rail trip from Weiden West to the stop at the RheinEnergieStadion takes about ten minutes, so the stop is used by many football fans for home games of 1. FC Köln. Many commuters also use the stop because of the nearby Frechen-Nord junction on Autobahn 4. A park and ride facility with 430 parking spaces was therefore expanded to 680 parking spaces in 2008. As the occupancy of the parking lot is still very high during the week, a further increase in the number of parking lots is being discussed. According to the City of Cologne, this can only be done by establishing a parking garage since there are no more spaces available for expansion. This would require a grant from the state of North Rhine-Westphalia, which requires long-term planning.

History 
The station was built before the 2006 FIFA World Cup to relief the Stadtbahn trains from RheinEnergie Stadion (part of line 1) to the center of Cologne. When Weiden West was opened, people coming from west of Cologne could change there to the Stadtbahn instead of going via the Central Station of Cologne and use the westbound Stadtbahn to the stadium. It was opened on 28 May 2006 on a section of the Cologne–Aachen railway that was opened by the Rhenish Railway Company between Cologne and Müngersdorf on 6 September 1841.  At the same time, line 1 of the Cologne Stadtbahn was extended by about a kilometre to the west and a new terminus was built with four tracks.

Services 

The station is served by Rhine-Ruhr S-Bahn line S13 between Sindorf or Düren and Troisdorf and line S19 between Düren and Hennef (Sieg), Blankenberg (Sieg), Herchen or Au (Sieg). Together these lines provide a service every 20 minutes on weekdays and every 30 minutes on the weekend. During the peak, line S12 also provides services every 20 minutes between Horrem and Hennef (Sieg). It is also served by line 1 of the Cologne Stadtbahn.

Notes

External links 
 station diagram map 

S12 (Rhine-Ruhr S-Bahn)
Railway stations in Cologne
Rhine-Ruhr S-Bahn stations
Weiden-West
S13 (Rhine-Ruhr S-Bahn)
Cologne-Bonn Stadtbahn stations
Railway stations in Germany opened in 2006
2006 FIFA World Cup